Persiaran Kenanga is the municipal driveway (highway) in Kota Damansara, Petaling Jaya, Selangor, Malaysia. The driveway connects from Persiaran Surian to Kota Damansara Interchange of the New Klang Valley Expressway. This driveway is maintained by the Petaling Jaya City Council or Majlis Bandaraya Petaling Jaya (MBPJ).

List of junctions

Highways in Malaysia
Roads in Petaling Jaya